Bandar Mas is a settlement town in Kota Tinggi District, Johor, Malaysia. This town is located between Pengerang Highway (Federal Route 92) and Federal Route 99.

References

Kota Tinggi District
Towns in Johor